can refer to:
 Mount Haguro (Haguro-san), Yamagata Prefecture, Japan, one of the sacred Three Mountains of Dewa.
 Haguro, Yamagata, a previous town now part of Tsuruoka
 Imperial Japanese cruiser Haguro
 The second unit of Japanese Maritime Self-Defense Force Maya-class destroyer
 A previous train express service, see Akebono (train)

See also
 Haguroyama (disambiguation)
 Haguro Station (disambiguation)
 Ohaguro